"Love Me Jeje" is an Afro-soul song by U.S-based Nigerian recording artist Seyi Sodimu. Released in 1997 off his studio album titled Born in Africa, "Love Me Jeje" features vocals from Shafy Bello.

Reception
Upon its release, "Love Me Jeje" was an instant hit and was widely accepted by music lovers thus gaining massive airplay. The song has also been sampled by other Nigerian artists years after its release.

Remix version

On 30 May 2016, Seyi released the remix of the song with vocal appearance from American singer K. Michelle and musical production from Shizzi. The video for "Love Me Jeje (Remix)" was shot by Sesan Ogunro in Atlanta, U.S and premiered on YouTube on 30 May 2016.

References

External links

1997 songs
2016 songs